A quintet is a group or formation of five members, particularly musicians

Quintet or The Quintet may also refer to:
 Quintet (company), a Japanese video game developer
 Honda Quintet, a Honda Civic derived 5-door hatchback
 Quintet (film), a 1979 film directed by Robert Altman
 Quintet (grappling),  a 5 on 5 tag team Japanese grappling promotion
 Quintet (TV series), a Canadian music variety television series which aired on CBC Television in 1962
 Quintet (Prokofiev), chamber music by Sergei Prokofiev
The Quintet, group that recorded the album Jazz at Massey Hall
 The Quintet (album), a 1977 album by V.S.O.P.

See also
 Quintette (disambiguation)